Xantusia is one of three genera of night lizards (family Xantusiidae). Species of Xantusia are small to medium-sized, viviparous (live-bearing) lizards found in the U.S. Southwest and in northern Mexico.

Taxonomy and etymology
The names and descriptions of the genus Xantusia and the type species X. vigilis were published in 1859 by Spencer Fullerton Baird, the generic name commemorating the naturalist John Xantus.

Species
The following is a list of species in the genus.
Xantusia arizonae Klauber, 1931 – Arizona night lizard
Xantusia bezyi Papenfuss, Macey & J.A. Schulte, 2001 – Bezy's night lizard
Xantusia bolsonae Webb, 1970 – bolsón night lizard
Xantusia extorris Webb, 1965 – Durango night lizard
Xantusia gilberti Van Denburgh, 1895 – Gilbert's night lizard
Xantusia gracilis Grismer & Galvan, 1986 – sandstone night lizard
Xantusia henshawi Stejneger, 1893 – granite night lizard
Xantusia jaycolei R. Bezy, K. Bezy & Bolles, 2008
Xantusia riversiana Cope, 1883 – island night lizard
Xantusia sanchezi R. Bezy & Flores-Villela, 1999 – Sanchez's night lizard
Xantusia sherbrookei R. Bezy, K. Bezy & Bolles, 2008
Xantusia sierrae R. Bezy, 1967 – sierra night lizard
Xantusia vigilis Baird, 1859 – desert night lizard
Xantusia wigginsi Savage, 1952 – Wiggins's desert night lizard

References

Further reading
Baird SF (1859). "Description of New Genera and Species of North American Lizards in the Museum of the Smithsonian Institution". Proceedings of the Academy of Natural Sciences of Philadelphia 10: 253–246. (Xantusia, new genus, p. 255).
Boulenger GA (1885). Catalogue of the Lizards in the British Museum (Natural History). Volume II ... Xantusiidæ ... London: Trustees of the British Museum (Natural History). (Taylor and Francis, printers). xiii + 497 pp. + Plates I-XXIV. (Genus Xantusia, p. 327).
Stebbins RC (2003). A Field Guide to Western Reptiles and Amphibians, Third Edition. The Peterson Field Guide Series ®. Boston and New York: Houghton Mifflin Company. xiii + 533 pp. . (Genus Xantusia, pp. 305–306).

Xantusia
Reptiles of Mexico
Reptiles of the United States
Lizard genera
Taxa named by Spencer Fullerton Baird